DANEOPS, the DLR-Archenhold Near Earth Objects Precovery Survey, has been initiated to systematically search existing photographic plate archives for precovery images of known NEOs, and has thus far successfully precovered 146 objects.

External links
 DANEOPS Home Page

Near-Earth objects